(), meaning "the Benefactor" (from , "good", + , "doer, worker"), was an epithet, an honoring title, given to various benefactors.  Euergetism (literally "doing good deeds") was the practice of high-status and wealthy individuals distributing part of their wealth to the community.  For example, Archelaus I of Macedon supplied wood to Athens, taking the titles of proxenos and euergetes in 407/6 BC.

The title was given to several Hellenistic monarchs:

Antiochus VII Euergetes, Seleucid king, reigned 138–129 BC
Attalus III Philometor Euergetes, king of Pergamon, reigned 138–133 BC
Mithridates V Euergetes, king of Pontus, reigned 150–120 BC
Nicomedes III Euergetes, king of Bithynia, reigned 127–94 BC
Ptolemy III Euergetes, king of Egypt, reigned 246–222 BC
Ptolemy VIII Euergetes II, king of Egypt, reigned 169–164, 144–132, 126–116 BC
Telephos Euergetes, Indo-Greek ruler, reigned 75–70 BC
Tiraios I Euergetes, king of Characene, reigned 95/94-90/89 BC

The feminine form  was also used:

Cleopatra Euergetis, queen of Egypt, reigned 142–131, 127–101 BC

See also 
 Soter
 Epiphanes (disambiguation)
 Eusebes (disambiguation)
 Inscription of Parthian imperial power

Ancient Greek titles
Epithets